Oceanobacillus is a Gram-positive, rod-shaped and motile bacteria genus from the family of Bacillaceae with a peritrichous flagella. Oceanobacillus species are commonly found in saline environment.

Characteristics of Oceanobacillus spp. 
S.I. Paul et al. (2021) isolated and characterized four species of the genus Oceanobacillus from marine sponges of the Saint Martin's Island Area of the Bay of Bengal, Bangladesh. Colony, morphological, physiological, and biochemical characteristics of Oceanobacillus spp. are shown in the Table below.

Note: + = Positive, – =Negative, O = Oxidative, F = Fermentative

References

Further reading 
 
 
 
 
 

Bacillaceae
Bacteria genera